Bartsham Gewog (Dzongkha: བར་མཚམས་) is a gewog (village block) of Trashigang District, Bhutan. The community of Bartsham gewog depends on agriculture farming and the maximum source of income is from vegetable farming

References

Gewogs of Bhutan
Trashigang District